Maxchernes is a genus of pseudoscorpions in the subfamily Chernetinae.

References 

 Feeding in Maxchernes iporangae (Pseudoscorpiones, Chernetidae) in captivity. R de Andrade, P Gnaspini - Journal of Arachnology, 2002
 Mating behavior and spermatophore morphology of the cave pseudoscorpion Maxchernes iporangae (Arachnida: Pseudoscorpiones: Chernetidae). R de Andrade, P Gnaspini - Journal of insect behavior, 2003

External links 
 
 

Chernetidae
Pseudoscorpion genera